The Georgi Dimitrov Mausoleum was a ceremonial tomb on Prince Alexander of Battenberg Square in Sofia, Bulgaria. It was built in 1949 to house the embalmed body of Georgi Dimitrov, the first leader of Communist Bulgaria. After his death in 1950, the second communist leader of Bulgaria, Vasil Kolarov, was buried in the second niche of the east wall of the mausoleum. In 1999, following a heated public debate, it was destroyed by Ivan Kostov's UDF government.

Construction 
The white marble mausoleum was built in 1949 to contain the embalmed body of the first leader of Communist Bulgaria, Georgi Dimitrov (1882–1949); construction beginning immediately after the news of Dimitrov's death. It was completed in just six days, the time it took Dimitrov's body to be returned to Sofia from the USSR. Dimitrov's body remained in the mausoleum until August 1990, when Dimitrov's remains were cremated and the ashes buried in Central Sofia Cemetery.

Attempt to blow up the mausoleum 
In 1956, 14 anti-communists prepared a bombing of the mausoleum during a May Day demonstration. Clock bombs would have exploded after the leadership of the Bulgarian Communist Party and the country came on the podium. The act, which was planned by Stoyan Zarev, was intended to draw the attention of the world media to Bulgaria. In addition to the Mausoleum, Zarev also planned to blow up five important ministries. The group encountered difficulties in implementing the plan and was greatly delayed, until they were uncovered and arrested by the KDS in February 1960.

Maintenance and activities 
The mausoleum was an object of police protection of paramount importance.  The mausoleum was the center of state ceremonies in the People's Republic of Bulgaria, a place where foreign delegations lay wreaths when visiting the country and the state leadership from its rostrum receives the demonstrations and parades on the official holidays. The Bulgarian Land Force's National Guards Unit formerly performed public duties at the now destroyed mausoleum, in a ritual similar to today's changing of the guard at the Presidency. The guards at the mausoleum were part of Post №1, which was mounted on Sundays, Wednesdays, and on solemn occasions. Soldiers were selected from the Bulgarian People's Army as well as the Internal Troops of the Ministry of Interior. There were no cartridges in the rifles while on duty, as police were always on duty in the area. 

In 1974–1975 a major reconstruction of the mausoleum was carried out. The premises under the mourning hall were expanded and the air conditioning system was replaced, a plastically designed monumental door, the crystal chamber-sarcophagus and mosaics by Dechko Uzunov were installed .

Destruction 
The mausoleum itself was destroyed by Prime Minister Ivan Kostov's UDF government in 1999 after a heated nationwide debate. The prime minister and his party claimed that retaining the mausoleum was inappropriate following the fall of Communism in 1989 because it represented Bulgaria's repressive past. Even within the government there was opposition to destroying the building, and an opinion poll revealed that two-thirds of the population opposed the demolition. Proposals were made to turn the mausoleum into a museum or art gallery because it contributed to the unique atmosphere of the capital city.

In August 1999, the government made four attempts to demolish the building. The first three failed because they relied on a single powerful explosion. The building did not budge after the first two attempts and tilted only slightly after the third. The fourth (and successful) attempt was carried out using a series of consecutive, less powerful explosions.

See also 
Lenin's Mausoleum

References 

Buildings and structures completed in 1949
Buildings and structures in Sofia
Demolished buildings and structures in Bulgaria
Mausoleums in Bulgaria
People's Republic of Bulgaria
Mausoleum
Buildings and structures demolished in 1999